The Practical Shooting Federation of Argentina, Argentine Federación de Tiro Práctico de la República Argentina, is the Argentine association for practical shooting under the International Practical Shooting Confederation.

External links 
 Official homepage of the Practical Shooting Federation of Argentina

References 

Regions of the International Practical Shooting Confederation
Practical Shooting